Kugarchi (Kügärsen) is a rural locality (a selo) and the administrative centre of Surensky Selsoviet, Zianchurinsky District, Bashkortostan, Russia. The population was 856 as of 2010. There are 8 streets.

Geography 
Kugarchi is located 22 km southeast of Isyangulovo (the district's administrative centre) by road. Kinzyabulatovo is the nearest rural locality.

References 

Rural localities in Zianchurinsky District